Daniel James Benish (born November 21, 1961) is a former American football defensive tackle in the National Football League for the Atlanta Falcons and the Washington Redskins.  He played college football at Clemson University.

1961 births
Living people
American football defensive tackles
Atlanta Falcons players
Washington Redskins players
Clemson Tigers football players
Players of American football from Youngstown, Ohio